Baron Eddisbury, of Winnington in the County Palatine of Chester, is a title in the Peerage of the United Kingdom. It was created on 12 May 1848 for the Whig politician and diplomat Edward Stanley (1802–1869), son of the politician Sir John Stanley, 7th Baronet.

Edward Stanley started his career in 1831 as Whig member of the House of Commons before holding various cabinet posts under Prime Ministers Lord Melbourne, Lord Russell and Lord Palmerston. He became a member of the Privy Council in 1841, was created Baron Eddisbury in 1848 and served as Postmaster-General from 1860 to 1866.

In 1839, Lord Eddisbury's father Sir John Stanley, 7th Baronet, had been raised to the peerage as Baron Stanley of Alderley. Upon his death in 1850, his barony and the Stanley Baronetcy passed to Lord Eddisbury, who thereby became 2nd Baron Stanley of Alderley and 8th Baronet of Alderley Hall. These titles have remained united since; most holders have chosen to be known as Lord Stanley of Alderley. In 1909, Edward Stanley, the 4th Baron Stanley of Alderley and 3rd Baron Eddisbury, acquired a further title for the Stanley family when he succeeded his first cousin once removed, the 3rd Earl of Sheffield, according to a special remainder and thus inherited the title of 4th Baron Sheffield.

Barons Eddisbury (1848)
Edward John Stanley, 1st Baron Eddisbury, 2nd Baron Stanley of Alderley (1802–1869)
Henry Edward John Stanley, 2nd Baron Eddisbury, 3rd Baron Stanley of Alderley (1827–1903)
Edward Lyulph Stanley, 3rd Baron Eddisbury, 4th Baron Stanley of Alderley, 4th Baron Sheffield (1839–1925) (known as Lord Stanley of Alderley)
Arthur Lyulph Stanley, 4th Baron Eddisbury, 5th Baron Stanley of Alderley, 5th Baron Sheffield (1875–1931) (known as Lord Sheffield)
Edward John Stanley, 5th Baron Eddisbury, 6th Baron Stanley of Alderley, 6th Baron Sheffield (1907–1971) (known as Lord Stanley of Alderley)
Lyulph Henry Victor Owen Stanley, 6th Baron Eddisbury, 7th Baron Stanley of Alderley, 7th Baron Sheffield (1915–1971) (known as Lord Sheffield)
Thomas Henry Oliver Stanley, 7th Baron Eddisbury, 8th Baron Stanley of Alderley, 8th Baron Sheffield (1927–2013) (known as Lord Stanley of Alderley)
Richard Oliver Stanley, 8th Baron Eddisbury, 9th Baron Stanley of Alderley, 9th Baron Sheffield (b. 1956)

The heir presumptive is the present holder's uncle Hon. Charles Ernest Stanley (b. 1960).

See also
Baron Stanley of Alderley
Baron Sheffield
Stanley Baronets

References

Baronies in the Peerage of the United Kingdom
Noble titles created in 1848
Noble titles created for UK MPs
Stanley family